Dick DeGuerin (born February 16, 1941 in Austin, Texas) is a criminal defense attorney based in Houston, Texas, most notable for defending Tom DeLay, Allen Stanford, David Koresh and Robert Durst. In 1994, DeGuerin was named Outstanding Criminal Defense Lawyer of the Year by the State Bar of Texas Criminal Justice Section.

Education 
He earned a law degree in 1965 from the University of Texas at Austin and that same year, he was admitted to the State Bar.

Career 
Early in his career (1971–1982), he was an associate with Percy Foreman. In 2005, he defended former House Majority Leader Tom DeLay in DeLay's defense against indictments for money laundering and conspiracy, brought by Texas prosecutor Ronnie Earle.

DeGuerin, a Democrat, previously prevailed over Earle in a case involving misconduct charges against U.S. Senator Kay Bailey Hutchison. DeLay was found guilty, but the conviction was overturned on appeal. He also represented bankers involved in fraud cases tied to the Enron collapse.

He represented Waco, Texas leader David Koresh during Koresh's standoff with the FBI and the ATF agents. DeGuerin used a self-defense argument, and won, when he represented New York real estate heir Robert Durst, who admitted to killing and then dismembering the body of Durst's 71-year-old neighbor Morris Black, bagging the body parts and tossing them into Galveston Bay.  DeGuerin once again represented Durst at his arraignment in New Orleans on March 16, 2015 for the murder of Susan Berman in 2000 (which arose out of the HBO miniseries special The Jinx: The Life and Deaths of Robert Durst).

Other cases include participating in the Congressional impeachment hearing of U.S. District Court Judge Samuel B. Kent.
He represented Celeste Beard, Senator Kay Bailey Hutchison, David Mark Temple, convicted of killing his wife, who was 8 months pregnant, Allen Stanford, and Billy Joe Shaver.

He is an adjunct professor at The University of Texas School of Law, teaching criminal law.

Personal life 
DeGuerin is the older brother of attorney Mike DeGeurin, despite the different way they spell their last names.

A 2008 Houston Chronicle article about the brothers mentioned that Dick DeGuerin is married to his third wife.

References

External links

  DeGuerin & Dickson law practice homepage
 Dick DeGuerin's campaign contributions
 "Dream Team Shattered," Las Vegas CityLife 6 June 2004
 Profile
 Roundtop Register Interview

1941 births
Texas lawyers
People from Austin, Texas
Living people
Criminal defense lawyers
People from Houston